The list of ship launches in 1876 includes a chronological list of some ships launched in 1876.



References

Sources

1876
Ship launches